Jeremy & The Satyrs is an album by American jazz flautist Jeremy Steig released on the Reprise label in 1968. Steig initially formed the group to back folksinger Tim Hardin in 1966.

Reception 

Allmusic's Ritchie Unterberger said: "its early jazz-rock fusion, with bits of soul and blues, was better on paper than in execution. ... at times, about the only thing separating this from run-of-the-mill blues-rock or soul-rock was the very jazzy flute".

Track listing
All compositions by Adrian Guillery except where noted
 "In the World of Glass Teardrops" − 5:22
 "Superbaby" (Warren Bernhardt) − 3:52
 "She Didn't Even Say Goodbye" − 6:30
 "The Do It" (Guillery, Bernhardt) − 2:58
 "The First Time I Saw You Baby (With Your Pretty Green Eyes)" − 3:29
 "Lovely Child of Tears" (Bernhardt) − 3:55
 "(Let's Go to the) Movie Show" − 2:41
 "Mean Black Snake" (Traditional) − 5:15
 "Canzonetta" (Eddie Gómez) − 2:25
 "Foreign Release" (The Satyrs) − 3:21
 "Satyrized" − 3:41

Personnel
Jeremy Steig – flute
 Adrian Guillery − guitar, harmonica, vocals
Warren B. Bernhardt − electric piano, vocals
Eddie Gómez − bass
Donald McDonald – drums
Technical
Ed Thrasher - art direction
Jeremy Steig - cover illustration

References

Reprise Records albums
Jeremy Steig albums
1968 albums